was a town located in Mitoyo District, Kagawa Prefecture, Japan.

As of 2003, the town had an estimated population of 15,179 and a density of 488.23 persons per km². The total area was 31.09 km².

On January 1, 2006, Takuma, along with the towns of Mino, Nio, Saita, Takase, Toyonaka and Yamamoto (all from Mitoyo District), was merger to create the city of Mitoyo and no longer exists as an independent municipality.

External links
 Official website of Mitoyo 

Dissolved municipalities of Kagawa Prefecture
Mitoyo, Kagawa